Robles del Rio (Spanish: Robles del Río, meaning "Oaks of the River"), sometimes spelled as Robles Del Rio, is an unincorporated community in Monterey County, California. For statistical purposes, the community is part of the Carmel Valley Village census-designated place.

History
The town was laid out by Frank B. Porter in 1927. Porter bought  in the southeast corner of the  Rancho Los Laureles from the Del Monte Properties Company. They named the tract Robles del Rio, “oaks of the river.”

He sold the lodge on 15 February 1939 to David Prince and William "Bill" Woods.

In 1932, Porter formed the Robles del Rio Carmelo Water Company to provide water to residents. After the golf course was discontinued in 1941, he deeded its  meadow to the Water Company.

During the Great Depression in the United States, Robles del Rio lots and land acreage were sold at 40% discount. Residential lots were sold as low as $90.

In 1941, Porter opened the Robles del Rio Post Office, that would become Rosie's Cracker Barrel. The Post Office had 150 mail boxes. In 1952, service was transferred to the Carmel Valley Village Post Office.

The Ridge Restaurant at Robles del Rio, was located inside the main lodge. The outside deck was enclosed on three sides with views of Carmel Valley. In May 2010, the Robles del Rio Lodge burned to the ground after being vacant for several years. The Carmel Valley fire department could not determine the cause of the fire. In 2012, the property was purchased by the Lee Sang Duk family.

Government
At the county level, Robles del Rio is represented on the Monterey County Board of Supervisors by Mary Adams.

In the United States House of Representatives, Robles del Rio is in

References

External links
 

Unincorporated communities in California
Carmel Valley, California
Unincorporated communities in Monterey County, California
Populated places established in 1926